Hangmila Shaiza (19 September 1920 – 3 August 1997) was an Indian politician who was the first woman to be elected to the Legislative Assembly of Manipur. She served from 1990 to 1991, representing the Ukhrul Assembly constituency.

Shaiza first became involved in politics in the aftermath of the assassination of her husband, Yangmaso Shaiza, who was the Chief Minister of Manipur in 1984.

References

Manipur politicians
1920 births
1997 deaths
20th-century Indian women politicians
20th-century Indian politicians
Women in Manipur politics
Manipur MLAs 1990–1995
Janata Party politicians